Reginald William Bransby Nevill, 2nd Marquess of Abergavenny JP (4 March 1853 – 13 October 1927), styled Viscount Nevill between 1868 and 1876 and Earl of Lewes between 1876 and 1915, was a British peer.

Early life
Nevill was the eldest son of William Nevill, 1st Marquess of Abergavenny, by Caroline Vanden-Bempde-Johnstone, daughter of Sir John Vanden-Bempde-Johnstone, 2nd Baronet. One of his brothers was William Beauchamp Nevill. He was educated at Eton.

Career
Nevill never lived in Abergavenny. Besides the marquessate, he inherited the titles of Earl of Lewes, Viscount Nevill and Baron Bergavenny He was appointed a Justice of the Peace for Kent in 1880. He was also a "staunch Conservative" and patron of 24 livings. During his last years he was a "mentally afflicted" invalid, and "an inmate of a home in Cheshire". He died at Cheadle Royal, Cheshire, on 13 October 1927, aged 74. He was buried at Eridge Castle on 17 October. He never married and was succeeded in the marquessate by his younger brother, Lord Henry Nevill.

Notes

References

External links

1853 births
1927 deaths
20th-century British landowners
02
Reginald
People educated at Eton College
People from Rotherfield